Kjell Otto Moe (born 1 February 1956) is a Norwegian fencer. He competed in the team épée event at the 1976 Summer Olympics.

References

External links
 

1956 births
Living people
Norwegian male épée fencers
Olympic fencers of Norway
Fencers at the 1976 Summer Olympics
Sportspeople from Bergen
20th-century Norwegian people